This article contains a list of Wikipedia articles about Nepali politicians and activists who took part in 1951 democratic movement in Nepal.

 B.P. Koirala  
 Bhadrakali Mishra 
 Bidhyanath Pokhrel 
 Ganesh Man Singh  
 Gehendrahari Sharma
 Kunwar Inderjit Singh
 Manmohan Adhikari
 Matrika Prasad Koirala 
 Naradmuni Thulung
 Rajeshwor Devkota 
 Ram Prasad Rai
 Subarna Shamsher Rana 
 Ganesh Prasad Rijal
 Yubaraj Adhikari

See also
 Revolution of 1951

References

Lists of activists
Lists of Nepalese people
Lists of Nepalese politicians